My Way is an album by saxophonist Gene Ammons recorded in 1971 and released on the Prestige label.

Reception
Allmusic awarded the album 1½ stars with its review by Scott Yanow stating, "While Ammons sounds fine (his tone was never to be denied), the dated arrangements and unimaginative playing by the rhythm section (what is Roland Hanna doing on electric piano?) largely sink this effort".

Track listing 
 "Chicago Breakdown" (William S. Fischer) - 9:35  
 "What's Going On" (Renaldo Benson, Al Cleveland, Marvin Gaye) - 4:18
 "A House Is Not a Home" (Burt Bacharach, Hal David) - 3:40    
 "Sack Full of Dreams" (Gary McFarland, Louis Savary) - 6:25
 "Back in Merida" - 4:20  
 "My Way" (Paul Anka, Claude François, Jacques Revaux) - 6:00
Recorded at Van Gelder Studio in Englewood Cliffs, New Jersey on July 26, 1971

Personnel 
Gene Ammons - tenor saxophone
Robert Prado, Ernie Royal - trumpet (tracks 1, 2 & 4-6)
Garnett Brown - trombone (tracks 1, 2 & 4-6)
Richard Landry - tenor saxophone (tracks 1, 2 & 4-6)
Babe Clark - baritone saxophone (tracks 1, 2 & 4-6)
Roland Hanna - electric piano (tracks 1-3)
Billy Butler (tracks 4-6), Ted Dunbar (tracks 1 & 2) - guitar
Ron Carter - bass (tracks 4-6)
Chuck Rainey - electric bass (tracks 1 & 2)
Idris Muhammad - drums (tracks 1, 2 & 4-6)
Omar Clay - percussion (tracks 1, 2, 4 & 5)
Yvonne Fletcher, Patricia Hall, Loretta Ritter, Linda Wolfe - vocals (tracks 2 & 4)
Unidentified string section (tracks 2, 4 & 6)
Bill Fischer - arranger and conductor

References 

Gene Ammons albums
1971 albums
Prestige Records albums
Albums produced by Bob Porter (record producer)
Albums recorded at Van Gelder Studio